Door to Door is the sixth studio album by American rock band the Cars, released on August 25, 1987, by Elektra Records. The album was produced by frontman Ric Ocasek, with additional production by keyboardist Greg Hawkes. Three singles were released from the album, though only "You Are the Girl" reached the top 40 of the Billboard Hot 100, peaking at number 17. Door to Door became the Cars' lowest-charting studio album, peaking at number 26 on the Billboard 200, and within a year of its release the band would break up.

Background
Door to Door was both the group's last studio album with the original lineup before they disbanded in 1988 and the last to feature bassist Benjamin Orr before his death in 2000. The band would not release another studio album until Move Like This (2011).

Although by 1987, the Cars had reached the heights of superstardom, their last few albums had relied heavily on studio tricks and machines, but this album was an attempt to return to the group's original roots. For example, where the previous album, Heartbeat City, extensively used sampled and sequenced drums (a move that had somewhat alienated drummer David Robinson), this album returned to having Robinson performing the drums in the studio, often simultaneously with other band members.

During a writing jam session, the band began to play "Ta Ta Wayo Wayo", a song from their earliest days together. It had never been recorded in studio, except as a demo in 1977. They enjoyed the tune so much that the 1987 version of the song made it onto the album. The opening track, "Leave or Stay", also was originally a 1977 demo that was not properly recorded until Door to Door, although they had often played the song live in the band's early days. Both tracks had their respective 1977 demo versions eventually issued on the 1995 compilation Just What I Needed: The Cars Anthology.

The lead single from the album, "You Are the Girl", reached number 17 on the Billboard Hot 100 and number two on the Album Rock Tracks chart. The follow-up single, "Strap Me In", peaked at number 85 on the Hot 100, while reaching number four on the rock chart. The final single, "Coming Up You", peaked at number 74 on the Hot 100, as well as number 37 on the Hot Adult Contemporary chart.

The tour to promote Door to Door would turn out to be their last with the original lineup and the show on December 12, 1987 (the final show on the tour) at the Cobo Arena in Detroit would be the last time they performed with Orr.

Track listing

Personnel
Credits adapted from the liner notes of Door to Door.

The Cars
 Ric Ocasek – vocals, guitar
 Greg Hawkes – vocals, keyboards
 Benjamin Orr – vocals, bass guitar
 Elliot Easton – vocals, guitar
 David Robinson – vocals, drums

Technical
 Ric Ocasek – production
 Greg Hawkes – additional production
 Joe Barbaria – recording, mixing engineering
 George Marino – LP mastering
 Stephen Innocenzi – CD mastering
 Jamie Chaleff – second engineer
 David Heglmeier, Brian Sklarz, Tracy Wiener – special assistance
 Andy Topeka – technical assistance

Artwork
 Marco Glaviano – cover design, photography
 Emanuele DiLiberto – painting

Charts

Weekly charts

Year-end charts

References

1987 albums
Albums produced by Ric Ocasek
Albums recorded at Electric Lady Studios
The Cars albums
Elektra Records albums